Colonel Wol Akec Akol is a South Sudanese politician and military figure. He has served as Minister of Agriculture of Western Bahr el Ghazal since 18 May 2010.

References

South Sudanese politicians
Living people
South Sudanese military personnel
People from Western Bahr el Ghazal
Year of birth missing (living people)
Place of birth missing (living people)